The Australian Police Medal (APM) is awarded for distinguished service by a member of an Australian police force.
The APM was introduced in 1986, and replaced the Imperial King’s Police Medal for Gallantry and King’s Police Medal for Distinguished Service.

Awards are made by the Governor-General, on the nomination of the responsible minister in each state or territory, and at the federal level.  The total number of awards for each police force each year must not exceed one APM for every 1,000, or part of 1,000, sworn members in the force. Recipients of the Australian Police Medal are entitled to use the post-nominal letters "APM".

Description
 The APM is a circular, nickel-silver medal ensigned with the Crown of St Edward. The front of the medal displays the effigy of the Sovereign on a Federation Star, superimposed over a pattern of fluted rays.
 The back of the medal is inscribed with the words ‘Australian Police Medal’ and ‘For Distinguished Service’. The inscriptions are encircled by a wreath of the national floral emblem, the golden wattle.
 The 32 millimetre-wide ribbon features a central vertical stripe of dark blue flanked by two white stripes.

See also
Australian Honours Order of Precedence

References 

It's an Honour Australian Government website

Civil awards and decorations of Australia
 
Awards and honours of Australian law enforcement agencies
1986 establishments in Australia
Awards established in 1986
Long and Meritorious Service Medals of Britain and the Commonwealth